Charlotte Lee, Countess of Lichfield (5 September 1664 – 17 February 1718), formerly Lady Charlotte Fitzroy, was the illegitimate daughter of King Charles II of England by one of his best known mistresses, Barbara Villiers, 1st Duchess of Cleveland. Known for her beauty, Charlotte was married at age 12 to her husband, Edward Henry Lee, 1st Earl of Lichfield, with whom she had a large family.

Early life
 
 
Charlotte Lee was born Charlotte Fitzroy, on 5 September 1664, the fourth child and second daughter of Barbara Palmer, Countess of Castlemaine, the only child of the Royalist commander William Villiers, 2nd Viscount Grandison. She was placed in the care of a governess in Berkshire House.  

Charlotte Fitzroy's mother had separated from her husband Roger Palmer, 1st Earl of Castlemaine, but was still married to him. Castlemaine did not father any of his wife's children; Charlotte and her siblings were the illegitimate offspring of their mother's royal lover, Charles II. The king acknowledged his daughter and so she bore the surname of Fitzroy – "child of the King".

The diarist Samuel Pepys noted that the child would likely have good marriage prospects: "my Lady Castlemayne [Barbara Villiers] will in merriment say that her daughter (not above a year old or two) will be the first mayde in the Court that will be married…"  

Charlotte was the favourite niece of James, Duke of York, younger brother of Charles II, who would later reign as King James II. The historian John Heneage Jesse wrote of Charlotte Fitzroy: "we know but little of her except that she was beautiful." As a child, Charlotte was painted by the court painter Sir Peter Lely, Charles II's Principal Painter in Ordinary, in which she is seated with her Indian page, holding a bunch of grapes and dressed in pink silk. Today, the painting hangs in the York Art Gallery.

The art historian Anna Brownell Jameson described Charlotte Fitzroy as having "rivaled her mother in beauty, but was far unlike her in every other respect."

It appears that Charles II was a loving father. In 1682 he wrote to Charlotte: "I must tell you I am glad to hear you are with child, and I hope to see you here before it be long, that I may have the satisfaction myself of telling you how much I love you, and how truly I am your kind father, Charles Rex".

Marriage and children

On 16 May 1674, before her tenth birthday, Lady Charlotte was contracted to marry Sir Edward Lee, and they were married on 6 February 1677, in her thirteenth year. When Charles Stewart, 6th Duke of Lennox, died in 1673, Sir Edward was created Earl of Lichfield. Charlotte's dowry was agreed at £18,000, and her husband was awarded a pension of £2,000 per year. 

Together they had eighteen children: 
 Charlotte Lee, Lady Baltimore (13 March 1678 (Old Style) – 22 January 1721), 
 (1) Benedict Calvert, 4th Baron Baltimore, by whom she had six children.
 (2) Christopher Crowe, Consul of Leghorn, by whom she had four children.
 Charles Lee, Viscount Quarendon (6 May 1680 – 13 October 1680).
 Edward Henry Lee, Viscount Quarendon (6 June 1681 – 21 October 1713).
 Captain Hon. James Lee (13 November 1681 – 1711).
 The Hon. Francis Lee (14 February 1685).
 Lady Anne Lee (29 June 1686 – d. 1716?), married N Morgan.
 The Hon. Charles Lee (5 June 1688 – 3 January 1708).
 George Henry Lee, 2nd Earl of Lichfield (12 March 1690 – 15 February 1743).
 The Hon. Francis Henry Fitzroy Lee (10 September 1692 – died 1730).
 Lady Elizabeth Lee (26 May 1693 – 29 January 1741). Married:
 (1) Francis Lee, a cousin. Had one son and two daughters, the eldest of whom, Elisabeth (d. 1736 at Lyon) married Henry Temple, son of the 1st Viscount Palmerston.
 (2) Edward Young, in 1731, author of the Night Thoughts, by whom she had one son. It is said that he never recovered from Elizabeth's death.
 Lady Barbara Lee (3 March 1695 – d. aft. 1729), married Sir George Browne, 3rd Baronet of Kiddington.
 Lady Mary Isabella Lee (6 September 1697 – 28 December 1697).
 The Hon. Fitzroy Lee (10 May 1698 – died young).
 Vice Admiral Hon. FitzRoy Henry Lee (2 January 1700 – April 1751), Commodore Governor of Newfoundland.
 The Hon. William Lee (24 June 1701 – died young).
 The Hon. Thomas Lee (25 August 1703 – died young).
 The Hon. John Lee (3 December 1704 – died young).
 Robert Lee, 4th Earl of Lichfield (3 July 1706 – 3 November 1776).

Ancestry

Death and legacy
Charlotte Lee died on 17 February 1718, aged 53, and was buried in All Saints Churchyard in Spelsbury, Oxfordshire, England.

A building was constructed right next to her house that would eventually be known as 10 Downing Street.

References

Notes

1664 births
1718 deaths
18th-century English people
17th-century English women
18th-century English women
Charlotte
English countesses
Daughters of British dukes
Illegitimate children of Charles II of England
Daughters of kings